Magdalene "Mieken" Rieck (26 April 1892 – 27 December 1977), married name Magdalene Galvao, was a German tennis player who was active in the early 20th century. She later became a sports administrator.

Biography
Rieck, who was a member of Harvestehuder THC, in 1910 and 1911 won the singles title at the German Championships in Hamburg. Her most significant result was winning the singles title at the World Hard Court Championships in 1913 in Paris, after having reached the final of this clay court tournament in 1912. In 1911 and 1913, Rieck participated in the Wimbledon Championships and reached the third round (last 16) in 1913 which she lost to Phyllis Satterthwaite. She entered the tennis event at the 1912 Olympic Games in Stockholm but did not play her first round match against Norwegian Valborg Bjurstedt.

Rieck, also an enthusiastic field hockey player, was administrator of the Deutschen Hockeybundes from 1929 until 1945 and from 1930 until 1945 president of the women's hockey at the International Hockey Federation. She died in December 1977, aged 85, in Hamburg.

World Hard Court Championships

Singles (1 title, 1 runner-up)

References

External links
 
 Munzinger biography

1892 births
1977 deaths
German female tennis players 
German female field hockey players
Tennis players from Hamburg